Shakul Samed (born 17 March 1999) is a Ghanaian boxer. He is competing in the men's light heavyweight division in the 2020 Summer Olympics.

He comes from a family of boxers, with his brothers Bastir Samir and Issah Samir representing Ghana also at the Olympics.

External links 
 Shakul Samed  at Olympics Tokyo 2020

References 

1999 births
Living people
Olympic boxers of Ghana
Boxers at the 2020 Summer Olympics
Ghanaian male boxers
African Games bronze medalists for Ghana
African Games medalists in boxing
Competitors at the 2019 African Games